Queva Griffin (10 August 1983 - 2003) was an Irish poet. A sufferer of Cystic fibrosis, Griffin was a double organ recipient, the first person under-25 to survive a heart-lung double transplant. She published a book of poetry as a fundraiser for the costs associated with her illness. She was named Young Person of the Year in 1998 for her courage during the transplant process. She died in 2003, after picking up an infection.

Works
The Light:A collection of poems 1996

References

Organ transplantation in the United Kingdom
Date of death missing
2003 deaths
1983 births
20th-century Irish poets
Deaths from cystic fibrosis
Lung transplant recipients
Heart transplant recipients